The Kindertransport (German for "children's transport") was an organised rescue effort of children (but not their parents) from Nazi-controlled territory that took place during the nine months prior to the outbreak of the Second World War. The United Kingdom took in nearly 10,000 predominantly Jewish children from Germany, Austria, Czechoslovakia, Poland, and the Free City of Danzig. The children were placed in British foster homes, hostels, schools, and farms. Often they were the only members of their families who survived the Holocaust. The programme was supported, publicised, and encouraged by the British government. Importantly the British government waived the visa immigration requirements that were not within the ability of the British Jewish community to fulfil. The British government put no number limit on the programme – it was the start of the Second World War that brought it to an end, at which time about 10,000 kindertransport children had been brought to the United Kingdom.

Smaller numbers of children were taken in via the programme by the Netherlands, Belgium, France, Sweden, and Switzerland. The term "kindertransport" is sometimes used for the rescue of mainly Jewish children, without their parents, from Nazi Germany, Austria, and Czechoslovakia to the Netherlands, Belgium, and France. An example is the 1,000 Chateau de La Hille children who went to Belgium. However, often the "kindertransport" is used to refer to the organised programme to the United Kingdom.

The Central British Fund for German Jewry (now World Jewish Relief) was established in 1933 to support in whatever way possible the needs of Jews in Germany and Austria.

In the United States, the Wagner–Rogers Bill was introduced in Congress, which would have increased the quota of immigrants by bringing a total of 20,000 Jewish children, but due to opposition from Senator Robert Rice Reynolds, it never left committee.

Policy

On 15 November 1938, five days after the devastation of Kristallnacht, the "Night of Broken Glass", in Germany and Austria, a delegation of British, Jewish, and Quaker leaders appealed, in person, to the Prime Minister of the United Kingdom, Neville Chamberlain. Among other measures, they requested that the British government permit the temporary admission of unaccompanied Jewish children, without their parents.

The British Cabinet debated the issue the next day and subsequently prepared a bill to present to Parliament. The bill stated that the government would waive certain immigration requirements so as to allow the entry into Great Britain of unaccompanied children ranging from infants up to the age of 17, under a number of conditions.

No limit upon the permitted number of refugees was ever publicly announced. Initially, the Jewish refugee agencies considered 5,000 as a realistic target goal. However, after the British Colonial Office turned down the Jewish agencies' separate request to allow the admission of 10,000 children to British-controlled Mandatory Palestine, the Jewish agencies then increased their planned target number to 15,000 unaccompanied children to enter Great Britain in this way.

During the morning of 21 November 1938, before a major House of Commons debate on refugees, the Home Secretary, Sir Samuel Hoare met a large delegation representing Jewish groups, as well as Quaker and other non-Jewish groups, working on behalf of refugees. The groups, though considering all refugees, were specifically allied under a non-denominational organisation called the "Movement for the Care of Children from Germany". This organisation was considering only the rescue of children, who would need to leave their parents behind in Germany.

In that debate of 21 November 1938, Hoare paid particular attention to the plight of children. Very importantly, he reported that enquiries in Germany had determined that, most remarkably, nearly every parent asked had said that they would be willing to send their child off unaccompanied to the United Kingdom, leaving their parents behind.

Although Hoare declared that he and the Home Office "shall put no obstacle in the way of children coming here," the agencies involved had to find homes for the children and also fund the operation to ensure that none of the refugees would become a financial burden on the public. Every child had to have a guarantee of £50 sterling to finance his or her eventual re-emigration, as it was expected the children would stay in the country only temporarily. Hoare made it clear that the monetary and housing and other aid required had been promised by the Jewish community and other communities.

Organisation and management

Within a very short time, the Movement for the Care of Children from Germany, later known as the Refugee Children's Movement (RCM), sent representatives to Germany and Austria to establish the systems for choosing, organising, and transporting the children. The Central British Fund for German Jewry provided funding for the rescue operation.

On 25 November, British citizens heard an appeal for foster homes on the BBC Home Service radio station from former Home Secretary Viscount Samuel. Soon there were 500 offers, and RCM volunteers started visiting possible foster homes and reporting on conditions. They did not insist that the homes for Jewish children should be Jewish homes. Nor did they probe too carefully into the motives and character of the families: it was sufficient for the houses to look clean and the families to seem respectable.

In Germany, a network of organisers was established, and these volunteers worked around the clock to make priority lists of those most in peril: teenagers who were in concentration camps or in danger of arrest, Polish children or teenagers threatened with deportation, children in Jewish orphanages, children whose parents were too impoverished to keep them, or children with a parent in a concentration camp. Once the children were identified or grouped by list, their guardians or parents were issued a travel date and departure details. They could only take a small sealed suitcase with no valuables and only ten marks or less in money. Some children had nothing but a manila tag with a number on the front and their name on the back, others were issued with a numbered identity card with a photo:

The first party of 196 children arrived at Harwich on the TSS Prague on 2 December, three weeks after , disembarking at Parkeston Quay. A plaque unveiled in 2011 at Harwich harbour marks this event.

In the following nine months almost 10,000 unaccompanied, mainly Jewish, children travelled to England.

There were also Kindertransports to other countries, such as France, Belgium, the Netherlands, and Sweden. Dutch humanitarian Geertruida Wijsmuller-Meijer arranged for 1,500 children to be admitted to the Netherlands; the children were supported by the Dutch Committee for Jewish Refugees, which was paid by the Dutch Jewish Community. In Sweden, the Jewish Community of Stockholm negotiated with the government for an exception to the country's restrictive policy on Jewish refugees for a number of children. Eventually around 500 Jewish children from Germany aged between 1 and 15 were granted temporary residence permits on the condition that their parents would not try to enter the country. The children were selected by Jewish organisations in Germany and placed in foster homes and orphanages in Sweden.

Initially the children came mainly from Germany and Austria (part of the Greater Reich after Anschluss). From 15 March 1939, with the German occupation of Czechoslovakia, transports from Prague were hastily organised. In February and August 1939, trains from Poland were arranged. Transports out of Nazi-occupied Europe continued until the declaration of war on 1 September 1939.

A smaller number of children flew to Croydon, mainly from Prague. Other ports in England receiving the children included Dover.

Last transport
 
The last transport from the continent with 74 children left on the passenger-freighter  on 14 May 1940, from IJmuiden, Netherlands. Their departure was organised by Geertruida Wijsmuller-Meijer, the Dutch organiser of the first transport from Vienna in December 1938. She could have joined the children, but chose to remain behind. This was a rescue action, as occupation of the Netherlands was imminent, with the country capitulating the next day. This ship was the last to leave the country freely.

As the Netherlands was under attack by German forces from 10 May and bombing had been going on, there was no opportunity to confer with the parents of the children. At the time of this evacuation, these parents knew nothing of the evacuation of their children: according to unnamed sources, some of the parents were initially even very upset about this action and told Wijsmuller-Meijer that she should not have done this. After 15 May, there was no more opportunity to leave the Netherlands as the country's borders were closed by the Nazis.

Trauma suffered by the children

Many children went through trauma during their extensive Kindertransport experience. Reports of this trauma is often presented in very personal terms, with trauma varying based on the child's experiences, including their age at separation from their parents, their experience during the wartime, and their experience after the war.

The primary trauma experienced by children in the Kindertransport was the separation from their parents. Depending on the child's age, the explanation for why they were leaving the country and their parents differed widely: for example, children might be told "you are going on an exciting adventure", or "you are going on a short trip and we will see you soon". Very young children, roughly six or younger, would generally not accept such an explanation and would demand to stay with their parents.

Older children, who were "more willing to accept the parents' explanation", would nevertheless realise that they would be separated from their parents for a long or indefinite period of time; younger children, in contrast, who had no developed sense of time, would not be able to comprehend that they may see their parents again, thus making the trauma of separation completely total from the very beginning. The actual leaving, via railway station, was also not a peaceful process, and there are many records of tears and screaming at the various railway stations where the actual parting took place.

Having to learn a new language, in a country where the child's native German or Czech was not understood, was another cause of stress. To have to learn to live with strangers, who only spoke English, and accept them as "pseudo-parents", was a trauma. At school, the English children would often view the refugee children as "enemy Germans" instead of "Jewish refugees".

Before the war started on 1 September 1939, and even during the first part of the war, some parents were able to escape from Hitler and reach England and then reunite with their children. However, this became the exception, as most of the parents of the refugee children were murdered by the Nazis.
 
Older refugee children became fully aware of the war in Europe during the period of 1939–1945 and would become concerned for their parents. During the latter years of the war, they may have become aware of the Holocaust and the actual direct threat to their Jewish parents and extended family. After the war ended in 1945, nearly all the children learned, sooner or later, that their parents had been murdered.

In November 2018, for the 80th anniversary of the Kindertransport programme, the German government announced that they would make a payment of €2,500 (about US$2,800 at the time) to each of the "Kinder" who was still alive. This payment, although a token amount, represented an explicit recognition and acceptance of the immense damage that had been done to each child, both psychological and material.

Transportation and programme completion

The Nazis had decreed that the evacuations must not block ports in Germany, so most transport parties went by train to the Netherlands; then to a British port, generally Harwich, by ferry from the Hook of Holland near Rotterdam. From the port, a train took some of the children to Liverpool Street station in London, where they were met by their volunteer foster parents. Children without prearranged foster families were sheltered at temporary holding centres at summer holiday camps such as Dovercourt and Pakefield. While most transports went via train, some also went by boat, and others aeroplane.

The first Kindertransport was organised and masterminded by Florence Nankivell. She spent a week in Berlin, hassled by the Nazi police, organising the children. The train left Berlin on 1 December 1938, and arrived in Harwich on 2 December with 196 children. Most were from a Berlin Jewish orphanage burned by the Nazis during the night of 9 November, and the others were from Hamburg.

The first train from Vienna left on 10 December 1938 with 600 children. This was the result of the work of Mrs. Gertruida Wijsmuller-Meijer, a Dutch organiser of Kindertransports, who had been active in this field since 1933. She went to Vienna with the purpose of negotiating with Adolf Eichmann directly, but was initially turned away. She persevered however, until finally, as she wrote in her biography, Eichmann suddenly "gave" her 600 children with the clear intent of overloading her and making a transport on such short notice impossible. Nevertheless, Wijsmuller-Meijer managed to send 500 of the children to Harwich, where they were accommodated in a nearby holiday camp at Dovercourt, while the remaining 100 found refuge in the Netherlands.

Many representatives went with the parties from Germany to the Netherlands, or met the parties at Liverpool Street station in London and ensured that there was someone there to receive and care for each child. Between 1939 and 1941, 160 children without foster families were sent to the Whittingehame Farm School in East Lothian, Scotland. The Whittingehame estate was the family home of Arthur Balfour, former UK prime minister and, in 1917, author of the Balfour Declaration.

The RCM ran out of money at the end of August 1939, and decided it could take no more children. The last group of children left Germany on 1 September 1939, the day Germany invaded Poland, and two days later Britain, France, and other countries declared war on Germany. A party left Prague on 3 September 1939, but was sent back.

Sculpture groups on the Route de Kindertransport
Created from personal experienceFrank Meisler's sculpture groups show both similarities and different design details and have since become the European route of children's transport. In different locations, the memorials show two groups of children and young people standing with their backs to each other waiting for a train. Depicted in different colors, the group of the rescued is outnumbered, as the majority of Jewish children (more than 1 million) perished in the Nazi death camps.

 2006: Kindertransport – The Arrival at the initiative of Prince Charles there is a monument to the Kindertransporten at London Liverpool Street Station, where the children from Hook of Holland arrived.
 2008: Children's Transport Monument. Züge ins Leben – Züge in den Tod: 1938–1939 (Trains to life – trains to death) at Berlin Friedrichstraße station for the rescue of 10,000 Jewish children, who traveled from here to London. The monument was unveiled on November 30, 2008.
 2009: Kindertransport – Die Abreise (The Departure). At the request of the mayor of Gdańsk, Paweł Adamowicz, Frank Meisler designed another group of children's sculptures in May 2009, in memory of 124 departing children.
 2011: Crossing Channel to life. Monument to the 10,000 Jewish children who traveled from Hook of Holland to Harwich. The newspaper De Rotterdammer of 11 November 1938 is depicted next to the sitting boy, with the messages The admission of German Jewish children and Thousands of Jews must leave Germany.
 2015: Kindertransport – Der letzte Abschied (The last farewell), at Hamburg Dammtor station.

In September 2022 a bronze memorial entitled Safe Haven was unveiled on Harwich Quay by Dame Stephanie Shirley, a former Kindertransport child. The work by artist Ian Wolter is a life-size, bronze sculpture of five Kindertransport refugees descending a ship’s gangplank. Each child is portrayed with a different emotion representing the storm of emotions they must have felt at the end of their journey by train and then ship. The figures are also engraved with quotes of four of the refugees describing their first experience of the UK. The memorial is within sight of the landing place at Parkeston Quay of thousands of Kindertransport children.

Habonim hostels
A number of members of Habonim, a Jewish youth movement inclined to socialism and Zionism, were instrumental in running the country hostels of South West England. These members of Habonim were held back from going to live on kibbutz by the war.

Records

Records for many of the children who arrived in the UK through the Kindertransports are maintained by World Jewish Relief through its Jewish Refugees Committee.

Recovery
At the end of the war, there were great difficulties in Britain as children from the Kindertransport tried to reunite with their families.  Agencies were flooded with requests from children seeking to find their parents, or any surviving member of their family. Some of the children were able to reunite with their families, often travelling to far-off countries in order to do so.  Others discovered that their parents had not survived the war.  In her novel about the Kindertransport titled The Children of Willesden Lane, Mona Golabek describes how often the children who had no families left were forced to leave the homes that they had gained during the war in boarding houses in order to make room for younger children flooding the country.

Nicholas Winton
Before Christmas 1938, Nicholas Winton, a 29-year-old British stockbroker of German-Jewish origin, travelled to Prague to help a friend involved in Jewish refugee work. Under the loose direction of the British Committee for Refugees from Czechoslovakia, headed by Doreen Warriner, Winton spent three weeks in Prague compiling a list of children in Czechoslovakia, mostly Jewish, who were refugees from Nazi Germany. He then went back to Britain with the objective of fulfilling the legal requirements to bring the children to Britain and to find homes for them. Trevor Chadwick remained behind to head the children's programme in Czechoslovakia. Winton's mother also worked with him to place the children in homes, and later hostels, with a team of sponsors from groups like Maidenhead Rotary Club and Rugby Refugee Committee. Throughout the summer, he placed advertisements seeking British families to take them in. A total of 669 children were evacuated from Czechoslovakia to Britain in 1939 through the work of Chadwick, Warriner, Beatrice Wellington, Quaker volunteers, and others who worked in Czechoslovakia while Winton was in Britain. The last group of children, which left Prague on 3 September 1939, was turned back because the Nazis had invaded Poland – the beginning of the Second World War.

The work of the BCRC in Czechoslovakia was little noted until 1988 when the refugee children held a reunion. By that time most of the people who had worked in the kindertransport in Czechoslovakia had died and Winton became the symbol of British help to refugees fleeing the Nazis, especially Jewish refugees, before the Second World War.

Wilfrid Israel
Wilfrid Israel (1899–1943) was a key figure in the rescue of Jews from Germany and occupied Europe. He warned the British government, through Lord Samuel, of the impending Kristallnacht in November 1938. Through a British agent, Frank Foley, passport officer at the Berlin consulate, he kept British intelligence informed of Nazi activities.

Rabbi Solomon Schonfeld
Rabbi Solomon Schonfeld brought in 300 children who practised Orthodox Judaism, under auspices of the Chief Rabbi's Religious Emergency Council. He housed many of them in his London home for a while. During the Blitz he found for them in the countryside often non-Jewish foster homes. In order to assure the children follow Jewish dietary laws (Kashrut), he instructed them to say to the foster parents that they are fish-eating vegetarians. He also saved large numbers of Jews with South American protection papers. He brought over to England several thousand young people, rabbis, teachers, ritual slaughterers, and other religious functionaries.

Internment and war service

In June 1940, Winston Churchill, the British Prime Minister, ordered the internment of all male 16-to 70-year-old refugees from enemy countries – so-called 'friendly enemy aliens' (an incongruous term). A complete history of this internment episode is given in the book Collar the Lot!.

Many of the children who had arrived in earlier years were now young men, and so they were also interned. Approximately 1,000 of these prior-kinder were interned in these internment camps, many on the Isle of Man. Around 400 were transported overseas to Canada and Australia (see HMT Dunera).

The fast, unescorted liner, SS Arandora Star was sunk by German submarine U-47 on 2 July 1940. Many of her 1213 German, Italian, and Austrian refugees, and internees (she was also carrying 86 German POWs) were ex-Kindertransport children. There was difficulty launching the lifeboats, and as a result, 805 people died out of the original complement of 1673. This led  to evacuations of British children on passenger liners under the Children's Overseas Reception Board and the United States Committee for the Care of European Children to be protected by convoys.

As the camp internees reached the age of 18, they were offered the chance to do war work or to enter the Army Auxiliary Pioneer Corps. About 1,000 German and Austrian prior-kinder who reached adulthood went on to serve in the British armed forces, including in combat units. Several dozen joined elite formations such as the Special Forces, where their language skills were put to good use during the Normandy landings, and afterwards as the Allies progressed into Germany. One of these was Peter Masters, who wrote a book which he proudly titled Striking Back.

Nearly all the interned 'friendly enemy aliens' were refugees who had fled Hitler and Nazism, and nearly all were Jewish. When Churchill's internment policy became known, there was a debate in Parliament. Many speeches expressed horror at the idea of interning refugees, and a vote overwhelmingly instructed the Government to "undo" the internment.

United Kingdom and the United States

In contrast to the Kindertransport, where the British Government waived immigration visa requirements, these OTC children received no United States government visa immigration assistance. Furthermore, it is documented that the State Department deliberately made it very difficult for any Jewish refugee to get an entrance visa.

In 1939 Senator Robert F. Wagner and Rep. Edith Rogers proposed the Wagner-Rogers Bill in the United States Congress. This bill was to admit 20,000 unaccompanied Jewish child refugees under the age of 14 into the United States from Nazi Germany. However, in February 1939, this bill failed to get Congressional approval.

Notable people saved

A number of children saved by the Kindertransports went on to become prominent figures in public life, with two (Walter Kohn, Arno Penzias) becoming Nobel Prize winners. These include:
 Benjamin Abeles (from Czechoslovakia), physicist
 Yosef Alon (from Czechoslovakia), Israeli military officer and fighter pilot who served as air and naval attaché to the United States, assassinated under suspicious circumstances in Maryland in 1973.
 Alfred Bader (from Austria), Canadian chemist, businessman, and philanthropist
 Ruth Barnett (from Germany), British writer
 Leslie Brent (from Germany), British immunologist
 Julius Carlebach (from Germany), British sociologist, historian and rabbi
 Rolf Decker (from Germany), American professional, Olympic, and international footballer
 Alfred Dubs, Baron Dubs (from Czechoslovakia), British politician
 Susan Einzig (from Germany), British book illustrator and art teacher
 Hedy Epstein (from Germany), American political activist
 Rose Evansky (from Germany), British hairdresser
 Walter Feit (from Austria), American mathematician
 John Grenville (from Germany), British historian
 Hanus J. Grosz (from Czechoslovakia), American psychiatrist & neurologist
 Karl W. Gruenberg (from Austria), British mathematician
 Heini Halberstam (from Czechoslovakia), British mathematician
 Geoffrey Hartman (from Germany), American literary critic
 Eva Hesse (from Germany), American artist
 David Hurst (from Germany), actor
 Otto Hutter (from Austria), British physiologist
 Robert L. Kahn (from Germany), American professor of German studies and poet
 Helmut Kallmann (from Germany), Canadian musicologist and librarian
 Walter Kaufmann (from Germany), Australian and German author
 Peter Kinley (from Vienna), born Peter Schwarz in 1926, British artist
 Walter Kohn (from Austria), American physicist and Nobel laureate
 Renata Laxova (from Czechoslovakia), American geneticist
 Gerda Mayer (from Czechoslovakia), British poet
 Frank Meisler (from Danzig), Israeli architect and sculptor
 Gustav Metzger (from Germany), artist and political activist resident in Britain and stateless by choice
 Isi Metzstein OBE (from Germany), British architect
 Ruth Morley, nee Birnholz (from Austria), American costume designer for film and theater, created the Annie Hall look
 Otto Newman (from Austria), British sociologist
 Arno Penzias (from Germany), American physicist and Nobel laureate
 Hella Pick CBE (from Austria), British journalist
 Sir Erich Reich (from Austria), British entrepreneur
 Karel Reisz (from Czechoslovakia), British film director
 Lily Renée Wilhelm (from Austria), American comic book pioneer (graphic novelist, illustrator)
 Wolfgang Rindler (from Austria), British/American physicist prominent in the field of general relativity
 Paul Ritter (from Czechoslovakia), architect, planner and author
 Michael Roemer (from Germany), film director, producer and writer
 Dr. Fred Rosner (from Germany), Professor of medicine and medical ethicist
 Joe Schlesinger, CM (from Czechoslovakia), Canadian journalist and author
 Hans Schwarz (from Austria), artist 
 Lore Segal (from Austria), American novelist, translator, teacher, and author of children's books, whose adult book Other People's Houses describes her own knocked-from-house-to-house experiences
 Robert A. Shaw (b. Schlesinger, Vienna) British, professor of chemistry
 Dame Stephanie Steve Shirley CH, DBE, FREng (from Germany), British businesswoman and philanthropist
 Michael Steinberg, (from Breslau, Germany—now Wrocław, Poland), American music critic
 Sir Guenter Treitel (from Germany), British law scholar
 Marion Walter (from Germany), American mathematics educator
 Hanuš Weber (from Czechoslovakia), Swedish TV producer
 Yitzchok Tuvia Weiss (from Czechoslovakia), Chief Rabbi of Jerusalem 
 Peter Wegner (from Austria), American computer scientist.
 Ruth Westheimer (born Karola Siegel, 1928; known as "Dr. Ruth") (from Germany), German-American sex therapist, talk show host, author, professor, and former Haganah sniper.
 Herbert Wise (from Austria), British theatre and television director.
 George Wolf (from Austria), American professor of physiological chemistry
 Astrid Zydower (from Germany), British sculptor

Post-war organisations
In 1989, who escaped Germany via Kindertransport, organised the Reunion of Kindertransport, a 50th-anniversary gathering of kindertransportees in London in June 1989. This was a first, with over 1,200 people, kindertransportees and their families, attending from all over the world. Several came from the east coast of the US and wondered whether they could organise something similar in the U.S. They founded the Kindertransport Association in 1991.

The Kindertransport Association is a national American not-for-profit organisation whose goal is to unite these child Holocaust refugees and their descendants. The association shares their stories, honours those who made the Kindertransport possible, and supports charitable work that aids children in need. The Kindertransport Association declared 2 December 2013, the 75th anniversary of the day the first Kindertransport arrived in England, as World Kindertransport Day.

In the United Kingdom, the Association of Jewish Refugees houses a special interest group called the Kindertransport Organisation.

The Kindertransport programme in media

The Kindertransport programme is an essential and unique part of the tragic history of the Holocaust. For this reason, it was important to bring the story to public awareness.

Documentary films
The Hostel (1990), a two-part BBC documentary, narrated by Andrew Sachs. It documented the lives of 25 people who fled the Nazi regime, 50 years on from when they met for the first time as children in 1939, at the Carlton Hotel in Manningham, Bradford.

My Knees Were Jumping: Remembering the Kindertransports (1996; released theatrically in 1998), narrated by Joanne Woodward. It was nominated for the Grand Jury Prize at the Sundance Film Festival. It was directed by Melissa Hacker, daughter of costume designer Ruth Morley, who was a Kindertransport child. Melissa Hacker has been very influential in organizing the kinder who now live in America. She was also involved in working to arrange the award of 2,500 euros from the German Government to each of the kinder.

Into the Arms of Strangers: Stories of the Kindertransport (2000), narrated by Judi Dench and winner of the 2001 Academy Award for best feature documentary. It was produced by Deborah Oppenheimer, daughter of a Kindertransport child, and written and directed by three-time Oscar winner Mark Jonathan Harris. This film shows the Kindertransport in very personal terms by presenting the actual stories through in-depth interviews with several individual kinder, rescuers Norbert Wollheim and Nicholas Winton, a foster mother who took in a child, and a mother who lived to be reunited with daughter Lore Segal. It was shown in cinemas around the world, including in Britain, the United States, Austria, Germany, and Israel, at the United Nations, and on HBO and PBS. A companion book with the same title expands upon the film.

The Children Who Cheated the Nazis (2000), a Channel 4 documentary film. It was narrated by Richard Attenborough, directed by Sue Read, and produced by Jim Goulding. Attenborough's parents were among those who responded to the appeal for families to foster the refugee children; they took in two girls.

Nicky's Family (2011), a Czech documentary film. It includes an appearance by Nicholas Winton.

The Essential Link: The Story of Wilfrid Israel (2017), an Israeli documentary film by Yonatan Nir. It includes a part that discusses the initiation and launching of the Kindertransport, in which Wilfrid Israel played a significant part. Seven men and women from very different countries and backgrounds tell the stories, of the days before and when they boarded the Kindertransport trains in Germany.

Plays
Kindertransport: The Play (1993), a play by Diane Samuels. It examines the life, during the war and afterwards, of a Kindertransport child. It presents the confusions and traumas that arose for many kinder, before and after they were fully integrated into their British foster homes. And, as importantly, their confusion and trauma when their real parents reappeared in their lives; or more likely and tragically, when they learned that their real parents were dead. There is also a companion book by the same name.

The End Of Everything Ever (2005), a play for children by the New International Encounter group, which follows the story of a child sent from Czechoslovakia to London by train.

Books
I came alone - the stories of the Kindertransports  (1990, The Book Guild Ltd) edited by Bertha Leverton and Shmuel Lowensohn, is a collective non-fiction description by 180 of the children of their journey fleeing to England from December 1938 to September 1939 unaccompanied by their parents, to find refuge from Nazi persecution.

And the policeman smiled - 10,000 children escape from Nazi Europe (1990, Bloomsbury Publishing) by Barry Turner, relates the tales of those who organised the Kindertransporte, the families who took them in and the experiences of the Kinder.

Austerlitz (2001), by the German-British novelist W. G. Sebald, is an odyssey of a Kindertransport boy brought up in a Welsh manse who later traces his origins to Prague and then goes back there. He finds someone who knew his mother, and he retraces his journey by train.

Into the Arms of Strangers: Stories of the Kindertransport (2000, Bloomsbury Publishing), by Mark Jonathan Harris and Deborah Oppenheimer, with a preface by Lord Richard Attenborough and historical introduction by David Cesarani. Companion book to the Oscar-winning documentary, Into the Arms of Strangers: Stories of the Kindertransport with expanded stories from the film and additional interviews not included in the film.

Sisterland (2004), a young adult novel by Linda Newbery, concerns a Kindertransport child, Sarah Reubens, who is now a grandmother; sixteen-year-old Hilly uncovers the secret her grandmother has kept hidden for years. This novel was shortlisted for the 2003 Carnegie Medal.

My Family for the War (2013), a young adult novel by Anne C. Voorhoeve, recounts the story of Franziska Mangold, a ten-year-old Christian girl of Jewish ancestry who goes on the Kindertransport to live with an Orthodox British family.

Far to Go (2012), a novel by Alison Pick, a Canadian writer and descendant of European Jews, is the story of a Sudetenland Jewish family who flee to Prague and use bribery to secure a place for their six-year-old son aboard one of Nicholas Winton's transports.

The English German Girl (2011), a novel by British writer Jake Wallis Simons, is the fictional account of a 15-year-old Jewish girl from Berlin who is brought to England via the Kindertransport operation.

The Children of Willesden Lane (2017), a historical novel for young adults by Mona Golabek and Lee Cohen, about the Kindertransport, told through the perspective of Lisa Jura, mother of Mona Golabek.

The last train to London (2020), a fictionalised account of the activities of Mrs. Geertruida Wijsmuller-Meijer by Meg Waite Clayton, also translated in Dutch and published as De laatste trein naar de vrijheid.

Escape From Berlin (2013), a novel by Irene N. Watts, is the fictional account of two Jewish girls, Marianne Kohn and Sophie Mandel, who fled Berlin through the Kindertransport.

Personal accounts

 Bob Rosner (2005) One of the Lucky Ones: rescued by the Kindertransport, Beth Shalom in Nottinghamshire. . -- An account of 9-year-old Robert from Vienna and his 13-year-old sister Renate, who stayed throughout the war with Leo Schultz in Hull and attended Kingston High School. Their parents survived the war and Renate returned to Vienna.
 Brand, Gisele. Comes the Dark. Verand Press, (2003). . Published in Australia. A fictional account of the author's family life up to the beginning of the war, her experiences on the kinder-transport and life beyond.
 David, Ruth. Child of our Time: A Young Girl's Flight from the Holocaust, I.B. Tauris.
 Fox, Anne L., and Podietz, Eva Abraham. Ten Thousand Children: True stories told by children who escaped the Holocaust on the Kindertransport. Behrman House, Inc., (1999). . Published in West Orange, New Jersey, United States of America.
 Golabek, Mona and Lee Cohen. The Children of Willesden Lane — account of a young Jewish pianist who escaped the Nazis by the Kindertransport.
 Edith Bown-Jacobowitz, (2014) "Memories and Reflections:a refugee's story", 154 p, by 11 point book antiqua (create space), Charleston, USA , Bown went in 1939 with her brother Gerald on Kindertransport from Berlin to Belfast and to Millisle Farm (Northern Ireland) [more info|Wiener Library Catalogue 
 Newman, Otto, British sociologist and author; Escapes and Adventures: A 20th Century Odyssey. Lulu Press, 2008.
 Oppenheimer, Deborah and Harris, Mark Jonathan. Into the Arms of Strangers: Stories of the Kindertransport (2000, republished 2018, Bloomsbury/St Martins, New York & London) .
 Segal, Lore. Other People's Houses – the author's life as a Kindertransport girl from Vienna, told in the voice of a child. The New Press, New York 1994.
 Smith, Lyn. Remembering: Voices of the Holocaust. Ebury Press, Great Britain, 2005, Carroll & Graf Publishers, New York, 2006. .
 Strasser, Charles. From Refugee to OBE. Keller Publishing, 2007, .
 Weber, Hanuš. Ilse: A Love Story Without a Happy Ending, Stockholm: Författares Bokmaskin, 2004. Weber was a Czech Jew whose parents placed him on the last Kindertransport from Prague in June 1939. His book is mostly about his mother, who was killed in Auschwitz in 1944.
 Whiteman, Dorit. The Uprooted: A Hitler Legacy: Voices of Those Who Escaped Before the "Final Solution" by Perseus Books, Cambridge, MA 1993.
 A collection of personal accounts can be found at the website of the Quakers in Britain at www.quaker.org.uk/kinder.
 Leverton, Bertha and Lowensohn, Shmuel (editors), I Came Alone: The Stories of the Kindertransports, The Book Guild, Ltd., 1990. .
 Shirley, Dame Stephanie, Let IT Go: The Memoirs of Dame Stephanie Shirley. After her arrival in the UK as a five-year-old Kindertransport refugee, she went on to make a fortune in with her software company; much of which she gave away.
 
Part of The Family – The Christadelphians and the Kindertransport, a collection of personal accounts of Kindertransport children sponsored by Christadelphian families. Part of the Family

Winton train

On 1 September 2009, a special Winton train set off from the Prague Main railway station. The train, consisting of an original locomotive and carriages used in the 1930s, headed to London via the original Kindertransport route. On board the train were several surviving Winton children and their descendants, who were to be welcomed by the now hundred-year-old Sir Nicholas Winton in London. The occasion marked the 70th anniversary of the intended last Kindertransport, which was due to set off on 3 September 1939 but did not because of the outbreak of the war. At the train's departure, Sir Nicholas Winton's statue was unveiled at the railway station.

Controversy 
Jessica Reinisch notes how the British media and politicians alike allude to the Kindertransport in contemporary debates on refugee and migration crises. She argues that "the Kindertransport" is used as evidence of Britain's "proud tradition" of taking in refugees; but that such allusions are problematic as the Kinderstransport model is taken out of context and thus subject to nostalgia. She points out that countries such as Britain and the United States did much to prevent immigration by turning desperate people away; at the Évian Conference in 1938, participant nations failed to reach agreement about accepting Jewish refugees who were fleeing Nazi Germany.

See also
Jews escaping from Nazi Europe to Britain
Bunce Court School, Otterden, Kent
Elpis Lodge
Leica Freedom Train
Hanna Bergas – one of three teachers to help children arriving at Dovercourt
Anna Essinger – set up the reception camp at Dovercourt
Else Hirsch – helped organise ten Kindertransports
Chiune Sugihara – some 300 Jewish children are estimated to have been saved through his efforts
Norbert Wollheim – Jewish youth movement leader in Berlin, organised Kindertransports from Berlin

References

Further reading

Abel Smith, Edward (2017), "Active Goodness – The True Story of How Trevor Chadwick, Doreen Warriner & Nicholas Winton Saved Thousands From The Nazis", Kwill Publishing,

External links

 The Kindertransport Association – Organisation for Kinder and their families in the United States
 Educational site focusing on the children arriving in Britain.
 About World Jewish Relief's (formerly the Central British Fund) role in Kindertransport
 The Kindertransport Webpage maintained by the Association of Jewish Refugees in London, UK, with links to the Kindertransport Association of the United Kingdom.
 A collection of personal reminiscences and tributes from people who were rescued on the Kindertransport, collected by the Quakers in 2008.
 Accounts of the Quaker contribution to Kindertransport on the Search and Unite website.
 Link to information about the film "My Knees Were Jumping: Remembering the Kindertransports" (1996)
 Link to information about the film "Into the Arms of Strangers: Stories of the Kindertransport" (2000) 
 Link to free downloadable companion study guide for "Into the Arms of Strangers: Stories of the Kindertransport" (2000) 
 Link to information about the British documentary "The Children Who Cheated the Nazis" (2000)
 World Jewish Relief (formally known as The Central British Fund for German Jewry)
 Wiener Library in London (holds documents, books, pamphlets, video interviews on the Kindertransport)
 Archive of ten refugees in Gloucester in 1939
 Through My Eyes website (personal stories of war & identity – including 3 Kindertransport evacuees – an Imperial War Museum online resource)
 The Kindertransport Memory Quilt Exhibit at the Michigan Holocaust Center
 Interview with Ester Golan
 Kindertransport Memorial Collection at the Leo Baeck Institute Archives, New York, New York.
 Refugee children in the Netherlands
 Jewish Virtual Library article
 The Kindertransport to Great Britain - Stories from North Rhine-Westphalia (documentation by the Kindertransport Project Group of the Yavneh Memorial and Educational Centre, Cologne, Germany)
 Children depart 5.13 pm - Recollections of the Polenaktion and the Kindertransports of 1938/39 (online presentation commemorating the deportation of 17,000 Jewish people in the so-called Polenaktion as well as the rescue efforts known as Kindertransports)

 
Children in war
1938 in the United Kingdom
1939 in the United Kingdom
1938 in Germany
1939 in Germany
International response to the Holocaust
The Holocaust and the United Kingdom

Jewish emigration from Nazi Germany
Rescue of Jews during the Holocaust